Mandalay Region Government is the cabinet of Mandalay Region. The cabinet is led by chief minister, Maung Ko

Cabinet (2021 - current)

Cabinet (2016–2021)

Cabinet(2011-2016) 

The former Development Affairs minister is Phone Zaw Han who was replaced with Aung Maung.

References

State and region governments of Myanmar
Mandalay Region